Continent is the fourth studio album of the American deathcore band The Acacia Strain. This is the first album with bassist Jack Strong and second with drummer Kevin Boutot. Recording began on April 13, 2008, and it was released August 19, 2008 via Prosthetic Records. Frontman Vincent Bennett also spoke to MTV News about the release, saying it was the band's "darkest" effort to date. In 2018, the album was re-released on streaming services, featuring bonus tracks.

The album debuted at No. 107 on the Billboard 200 chart and No. 2 on the Billboard Heatseekers chart with first week sales of almost 5,600.

In September 2018, The Acacia Strain began a 10-year anniversary tour, where they played the record in full.

Track listing

Personnel 
Production and performance credits are adapted from the album liner notes.

The Acacia Strain
 Vincent Bennett – lead vocals
 Daniel Laskiewicz – lead guitar, programming, backing vocals
 Jack Strong – bass
 Kevin Boutot – drums

Production
 Zeuss – producer, mixing
 Alan Douches – mastering
 Paul A. Romano – art direction, artwork, design

Guest musicians
 Human Furnace (Ringworm) – vocals on "Baby Buster"

Charts

Trivia 
 Several of the album's tracks refer to the television show Arrested Development:
 "Seaward" (name of GOB's boat)
 "Forget-Me-Now" (name of GOB's date-rape drug)
 "Baby Buster" (Buster's Nickname)
 "Balboa Towers" (name of Lucille's Mansion Community)
 The final 3 lines of "Skynet" are a reference to the message board on Lambgoat.com
 An internet rumor circulated stating that lyrics on the first track, "Skynet", were written about the band Emmure and how they have allegedly  ripped off The Acacia Strain, although vocalist Vincent Bennett has denied this on stage numerous times. Regardless, Emmure responded to plagiarism claims in their song "R2DEEPTHROAT".

References 

2008 albums
The Acacia Strain albums